P. Seenivasan was an Indian politician of the Dravida Munnetra Kazhagam and Member of the Legislative Assembly Tamil Nadu. He served as the Deputy Speaker of the Tamil Nadu Legislative Assembly from 1971 to 1972. He was elected to the Tamil Nadu legislative assembly as a Dravida Munnetra Kazhagam candidate from Virudhunagar constituency and Sivakasi (State Assembly Constituency) in 1967, 1971 and 1989 elections.
He defeated the King maker K. Kamaraj in the 1967 assembly elections when he contested against him in the virudhunagar constituency.

Electoral performance

References

Dravida Munnetra Kazhagam politicians
Speakers of the Tamil Nadu Legislative Assembly
Deputy Speakers of the Tamil Nadu Legislative Assembly
India MPs 1957–1962
Lok Sabha members from Tamil Nadu
Politicians from Chennai
Year of birth missing
Year of death missing